The 2021–22 Coupe de France preliminary rounds, Brittany was the qualifying competition to decide which teams from the leagues of the Brittany region of France took part in the main competition from the seventh round.

A total of fourteen teams qualified from the Brittany preliminary rounds. In 2020–21, US Montagnarde progressed furthest in the main competition, reaching the round of 32 before losing to Olympique Saumur FC.

Draws and fixtures
On 28 June 2021, the Brittany league announced that 701 teams had entered the competition. The first round draw was published on 29 July 2021, with 578 teams entering at that stage. The second round draw was published on 31 August 2021, with 105 teams from Régionale 2 and Régionale 1 entering at this stage. The third round draw was published on 9 September 2021, with the teams from Championnat National 3 entering at this stage. The fourth round draw was published on 23 September 2021, with the teams from Championnat National 2 entering at this stage. The fifth round draw, featuring the teams from Championnat National, was made on 6 October 2021. The sixth round draw was published on 20 October 2021.

First round
These matches were played on 29 August 2021, with one postponed until 5 September 2021.

Second round
These matches were played on 5 September 2021, with one postponed until 12 September 2021.

Third round
These matches were played on 18 and 19 September 2021.

Fourth round
These matches were played on 2 and 3 October 2021.

Fifth round
These matches were played on 16 and 17 October 2021.

Sixth round
These matches were played on 30 and 31 October 2021.

References

preliminary rounds